Western Extension is generally used for any westward expansion of a road, rail line or populated place.  It may also have one of the following meanings:

 The Western Extension of the Pennsylvania Turnpike
 Western Extension of a Maryland railroad
 South Carolina Western Extension Railway
 Western Extension Area